Amiternum was an ancient Sabine city, then Roman city and later bishopric and Latin Catholic titular see in the central Abruzzo region of modern Italy, located  from L'Aquila. Amiternum was the birthplace of the historian Sallust (86 BC).

History
The site, in the upper Aterno valley, was one of the most important of Sabinum.

Amiternum was defeated by the Romans in 293 BC.

It lay at the point of junction of four roads: the Via Caecilia, the Via Claudia Nova and two branches of the Via Salaria. 

There are considerable remains of an amphitheatre and a theatre, all of which belong to the imperial period, while on the hill of the surrounding village of San Vittorino there are some Christian catacombs.

A well known Roman funerary relief of the first century BC depicts the Roman funeral procession or pompa.

Ecclesiastical history 
The modern name of the locality, San Vittorino, recalls the martyr of Victorinus, who is looked on as bishop of Amiternum, of the time of the persecution by Roman Emperor Nerva (30-98 AD), while other sources put the bishopric's foundation circa 300AD. Circa 400 AD it gained territory from the suppressed Diocese of Pitinum.

Other bishops of Amiternum include Quodvultdeus, who encouraged the religious veneration of Victorinus by constructing his tomb, Castorius, who is mentioned by Pope Gregory I, Saint Cetteus, martyred by the Lombards in 597, and Leontius, a brother of Pope Stephen II. The last known bishop is Ludovicus, who took part in a synod held in Rome in 1069.
 
Circa 1060 AD, the bishopric was suppressed and it the territory merged into the Rieti. In the mid-13th century the population was transferred to the newly founded town of L'Aquila, which was erected as a diocese by Pope Alexander IV on 20 February 1257, incorporating in it the territory that had once been that of the diocese of Amiternum.

Titular see 
No longer a residential bishopric, the name Amiternum has been used by the Catholic Church since 1966 as a  Latin titular bishopric.

It has had the following incumbents:
 Titular Bishop Stanislao Amilcare Battistelli, Passionists (C.P.) (1967.02.22 – 1976.01.06)
 Titular Archbishop Agostino Cacciavillan (1976.01.17 – 2001.02.21), 
 as papal diplomat (Apostolic Pro-Nuncio to Kenya (1976.01.17 – 1981.05.09), 
 Apostolic Pro-Nuncio to India (1981.05.09 – 1990.06.13), 
 Apostolic Pro-Nuncio to Nepal (1985.04.30 – 1990.06.13), 
 Permanent Observer to Organization of American States (OAS) (1990 – 1998.11.05), 
 Apostolic Pro-Nuncio to United States of America (1990.06.13 – 1998.11.05)), 
 President of Administration of the Patrimony of the Apostolic See (1998.11.05 – 2002.10.01)
 Titular Archbishop Timothy Paul Andrew Broglio (2001.02.27 – 2007.11.19)
 Titular Archbishop Luciano Suriani (2008.02.22 – ...)

References

Sources and external links
 Richard Stillwell, ed. Princeton Encyclopaedia of Classical Sites, 1976: "Amiternum (San Vittorino), Latium, Italy"
 GCatholic with titular incumbent bio links
Attribution:
 

Roman sites of Abruzzo
L'Aquila
Former populated places in Italy
Roman amphitheatres in Italy
Ancient Roman theatres in Italy
Populated places established in the 3rd century BC
Roman towns and cities in Abruzzo
National museums of Italy